John Birdsell Oren (December 27, 1909 – December 22, 2006) was a Rear Admiral in the United States Coast Guard.

Biography
Oren was born on December 27, 1909, in Madison, Wisconsin. He obtained a M.S. in Marine Engineering from the Massachusetts Institute of Technology. Oren married Virginia Prentis, who died in 2002. They had two children, Joan Strickler and John Oren.

Admiral Oren is survived by a daughter, Joan Oren Strickler and her husband, Warren, of Harrisonburg; a son, John Edward Oren and his wife, Diane, of Winston-Salem, N.C.; five granddaughters, Robin Strickler of Rwanda, East Africa, Alison Strickler of Chicago, Ill., Laura Strickler of Washington, D.C., Sydney McLure Carr of Ashburn, Va., Tara Oren of Winston-Salem; and a great-granddaughter, Adeline Grace Carr.

Oren died on December 22, 2006, in Harrisonburg, Virginia. He is buried at Arlington National Cemetery, Virginia.

Career
Oren originally joined the United States Navy in 1928 and later entered the United States Naval Academy. A year after entering the Naval Academy, he transferred to the United States Coast Guard Academy, graduating in 1933. During World War II, he served in the North Atlantic and the Pacific theaters. Later in his career, he served as Chief of Engineering of the Coast Guard and as president of the Society of American Military Engineers in 1966. He retired in 1967.

Awards he received include the Legion of Merit.

Legacy
The Society of American Military Engineers' Oren Medal, conferred since 1968, is named after Oren.

References

1909 births
2006 deaths
United States Coast Guard admirals
United States Coast Guard Academy alumni
MIT School of Engineering alumni
Recipients of the Legion of Merit
United States Coast Guard personnel of World War II
Military personnel from Madison, Wisconsin
Burials at Arlington National Cemetery